Lovelock Correctional Center (LCC) is a Nevada Department of Corrections prison in unincorporated Pershing County, Nevada, United States, near Lovelock.

History
Lovelock is in Pershing County and is the seventh major institution of the Nevada Department of Corrections. It was constructed and opened in two phases. The first started in August 1995 with two 168-cell housing units. Each  cell can house two inmates. Construction on the second phase saw two 168-cell units and two 84-cell units made available for the institution to hold 1,680 offenders. Its industrial plant, housed in two  buildings, makes garments and mattresses.

The facility received wide media coverage in 2008 when former American football star O. J. Simpson was sent there after being sentenced to 33 years' imprisonment, with a minimum of nine years before becoming eligible for parole, which was granted on July 20, 2017. He was released on October 1, 2017.

References

External links

 Lovelock Correctional Center

Prisons in Nevada
Buildings and structures in Pershing County, Nevada
O. J. Simpson
1995 establishments in Nevada